This is a list of Private Passions episodes from 1995 to 1999. It does not include repeated episodes or compilations.

1995

1996

1997

1998

1999

References

External links

Lists of British radio series episodes